The Orange Trophy is an annual friendly football tournament hosted by Valencia CF and first played in 1959.

1959

1961

1962

1964

1970

1972

1973

1974

1975

1976

1977

1985

2000

2003

2007

2010

2011

2012

2014

2015

2016

2017

2018

2019

2021

2022

Performance by team

Performance by nation

References
  Rec.Sport.Soccer Statistics Foundation

Spanish football friendly trophies
Valencia CF
1959 establishments in Spain